The 1990–91 Xavier Musketeers men's basketball team represented Xavier University from Cincinnati, Ohio in the 1990–91 season. Led by head coach Pete Gillen, the Musketeers finished with a 22–10 record (11–3 MCC), won the MCC regular season and conference tournament titles, and received an automatic bid to the NCAA tournament as the #14 seed in the Midwest region. In the NCAA tournament, the Musketeers defeated #3 seed Nebraska, then lost to #11 seed Connecticut in the second round.

Roster

Schedule and results

|-
!colspan=9 style=| Regular season

|-
!colspan=9 style=| Midwestern Collegiate Conference tournament

|-
!colspan=9 style=| NCAA Tournament

References

Xavier
Xavier Musketeers men's basketball seasons
Xavier